The Cucuana Fault is a dextral strike-slip fault in the departments of Tolima and Cundinamarca in Colombia.

Etymology 
The fault is named after the Cucuana River.

Description 
The Cucuana Fault is parallel to and south of the Ibagué Fault in the Central Ranges of the Colombian Andes, crossing Paleozoic metamorphic rocks, Mesozoic igneous rocks (Ibagué Batholith), and Tertiary beds. The fault extends into the Eastern Ranges across the Middle Magdalena Valley, cutting Cretaceous beds. The Quaternary sedimentary and volcanic fill of the Magdalena River valley is not reported as having been deformed by the fault. This fault has a prominent trace on satellite images. It has displaced drainages, spurs, fault saddles, and formed triangular facets, and appears to structurally control the course of the Cucuana River.

See also 

 List of earthquakes in Colombia
 Bucaramanga-Santa Marta Fault
 Romeral Fault System

References

Bibliography

Maps 
 

Seismic faults of Colombia
Strike-slip faults
Inactive faults
Faults
Faults